The Samsung Galaxy Z Fold 2 (stylized as Samsung Galaxy Z Fold2, sold as Samsung Galaxy Fold 2 in certain territories) is an Android-based foldable smartphone developed by Samsung Electronics for its Samsung Galaxy Z series, succeeding the Samsung Galaxy Fold. It was announced on 5 August 2020 alongside the Samsung Galaxy Note 20, the Samsung Galaxy Tab S7, the Galaxy Buds Live, and the Galaxy Watch 3. Samsung later revealed pricing and availability details on 1 September.

Specifications

Design 
Unlike the original Fold which had an entirely plastic screen, the screen is protected by -thick "ultra-thin glass" with a plastic layer like the Z Flip, manufactured by Samsung with materials from Schott AG; conventional Gorilla Glass is used for the back panels with an aluminum frame. The hinge mechanism is also borrowed from the Z Flip, using nylon fibers designed to keep dust out; it is self-supporting from 75 to 115 degrees. The power button is embedded in the frame and doubles as the fingerprint sensor, with the volume rocker located above. The device comes in two colors, Mystic Bronze and Mystic Black, as well as a Limited Edition Thom Browne model. In select regions, users are able to customize the hinge color when ordering the phone from Samsung's website.

Hardware  
The Galaxy Z Fold 2 contains two screens: its front cover uses a 6.23-inch display in the center with minimal bezels, significantly larger than its predecessor's 4.6-inch display, and the device can fold open to expose a 7.6-inch display, with a circular cutout in the top center right replacing the notch along with a thinner border. Both displays support HDR10+; the internal display benefits from an adaptive 120 Hz refresh rate like the S20 series and Note 20 Ultra.

The device has 12 GB of LPDDR5 RAM, and either 256 or 512 GB of non-expandable UFS 3.1. Storage availability varies by country, the 512 GB version is the most scarce by far. The Z Fold 2 is powered by the Qualcomm Snapdragon 865+, which is used in all regions (unlike other flagship Samsung phones that have been split between Snapdragon and Samsung's in-house Exynos chips depending on the market). It uses two batteries split between the two halves, totaling a slightly larger 4500 mAh capacity; fast charging is supported over USB-C at up to 25 W or wirelessly via Qi at up to 11 W. The Z Fold 2 contains 5 cameras, including three rear-facing camera lenses (12-megapixel, 12-megapixel telephoto, and 12-megapixel ultra wide-angle), as well as a 10-megapixel front-facing camera on the cover, and a second 10-megapixel front-facing camera on the inside screen.

Software 
The Galaxy Z Fold 2 shipped with Android 10 and Samsung's One UI software; by means of an improved Multi Window mode, up to three supported apps can be placed on-screen at once. Apps open on the smaller screen can expand into their larger, tablet-oriented layouts when the user unfolds the device. Additionally, supported apps will now automatically get a split-screen view with a sidebar and main app pane. New to the Z Fold 2 is split-screen functionality, called "Flex Mode", which is compatible with certain apps like YouTube and Google Duo along with native Samsung apps.

Luxury model 
In November 2020, Samsung unveiled the Samsung W21 5G, a luxury version of the Z Fold2, exclusively available to the Chinese market. The phone is identical to its counterparts, in terms of its design and specifications, with the exception of a slightly taller build and two SIM card slots. The phone features an exclusive "Glitter Gold" color, which consists of a seven-layer nano-level optical film attached to the glass back that has vertical ridges for added texture.

Gallery

See also 
 Samsung Galaxy Z series
 Samsung Galaxy Z Flip

References

External links 
 

Samsung Galaxy
Foldable smartphones
Mobile phones introduced in 2020
Mobile phones with multiple rear cameras
Mobile phones with 4K video recording
Dual screen phone
Discontinued flagship smartphones
Samsung smartphones